Hugh Paul Nuckolls (born October 3, 1941) is a politician in the American state of Florida. He served in the Florida House of Representatives from 1972 to 1982, representing the 91st district.

References

1941 births
Living people
Members of the Florida House of Representatives
People from Fort Myers, Florida
Cumberland School of Law alumni